Walter "Red" Jackson (June 3, 1908 – October 6, 1982) was a British-born Canadian professional ice hockey winger.

Background 
Jackson was born in Ibstock, England, United Kingdom, but moved to Winnipeg, Manitoba as a child. He played 84 games in the National Hockey League as a member of the Boston Bruins and New York Americans between 1932 and 1936. 

Jackson died in 1982.

Career statistics

Regular season and playoffs

See also
List of National Hockey League players from the United Kingdom

References

External links

1908 births
1982 deaths
Boston Bruins players
Boston Cubs players
Canadian ice hockey left wingers
Cleveland Falcons players
English emigrants to Canada
Fort Worth Rangers players
London Tecumsehs players
Minneapolis Millers (AHA) players
New Haven Eagles players
New York Americans players
St. Louis Flyers (AHA) players
Ice hockey people from Winnipeg
Syracuse Stars (IHL) players